Mulgi Parish is a rural municipality in southern Estonia. It is a part of Viljandi County. It is one of the southernmost municipalities of both Vilandji and Estonia, 4 miles (6.4 km) north of the Latvian border.

Geography
The administrative centre of the Mulgi municipality is the town of Abja-Paluoja. The municipality itself consists of 3 towns (Abja-Paluoja, Karksi-Nuia, Mõisaküla); 2 small boroughs (Halliste, Õisu); and 58 villages: 
Abja-Vanamõisa, Abjaku, Ainja, Allaste, Äriküla, Atika, Ereste, Hirmuküla, Hõbemäe, Kaarli, Kalvre, Kamara, Karksi, Kõvaküla, Kulla, Laatre, Lasari, Leeli, Lilli, Mäeküla, Maru, Metsaküla, Mõõnaste, Morna, Mulgi, Muri, Naistevalla, Niguli, Oti, Päidre, Päigiste, Pärsi, Penuja, Põlde, Polli, Pöögle, Pornuse, Räägu, Raamatu, Raja, Rimmu, Saate, Saksaküla, Sammaste, Sarja, Sudiste, Suuga, Tilla, Toosi, Tuhalaane, Ülemõisa, Umbsoo, Univere, Uue-Kariste, Vabamatsi, Vana-Kariste, Veelikse, and Veskimäe.

Religion

History
The municipality was formed on the 24th October, 2017, by merging of the town of Mõisaküla with the neighbouring municipalities of Karks, Abja, and Halliste.

There were many discrepancies in the past based on the naming of the Mulgi municipality; the naming council found Mulgi to be a misleading name both culturally and geographically, as the municipality only covers a third of the historical Mulgimaa – the municipalities of Halliste and Karks, to be more specific. Suggested names in its place included Lääne-Mulg, Abja-Mulg, and Halliste-Karksi.

Concerns have also been  raised about the loss of the name Abja. This stems from the history of the area; before the expansion of the Viljandi County borders in 1962, the district of Abja also existed in the same area.

References